Laboratory is an unincorporated community in Lincoln County, in the U.S. state of North Carolina.

History
Laboratory was named for a pharmaceutical laboratory which operated there during the American Civil War.

References

Unincorporated communities in Lincoln County, North Carolina
Unincorporated communities in North Carolina